A torpedo is a self-propelled explosive projectile that operates underwater.

Torpedo may also refer to:

Animals
 Torpedo (genus), the genus of electric rays
 More generally, any electric ray (order Torpediniformes)

Food
Torpedo or Torpil, a Turkish and Balkan dessert
Liquorice torpedo
"Syrian torpedo", English-language slang for a kibbeh, a torpedo-shaped stuffed croquette
One of the many slang terms for a submarine sandwich

Weapons
 Formerly a naval mine, a stationary explosive device placed in water, to destroy vessels
 Spar torpedo, an explosive device affixed to a spar extending from a boat, used to attack other vessels
 land torpedo, an obsolete term for land mine
 "Aerial torpedo", a naval term for early flying bombs and pilotless aircraft weapons
 Aerial torpedo, a self-propelled torpedo dropped into the water from aircraft
 Bangalore torpedo, an explosive device for land use
 Human torpedo, also called "Chariot", a variety of swimmer delivery vehicle of World War II

Transport
 Torpedo wagon, also known as a bottle wagon, a tank car design to carry molten steel
 Torpedo (car), an early form of usually large touring coachwork with smooth shape from front to rear
 Railroad torpedo, a device to warn approaching trains upon entering protected trackage
 Narco torpedo, a type of clandestine towed underwater barge used for illicit cargos
 Pontiac Torpedo, a full-sized car produced by Pontiac from the 1940 through the 1948 model years

Music
 "Torpedo", a 1995 song by Eraserheads from the album Cutterpillow
 Torpedo (album), a 2022 album by Welsh band Feeder

Fiction
 Torpedo (comics) or Torpedo 1936, a Spanish comic book series
 Torpedo (2012 film), a Belgian film by Matthieu Donck
 Torpedo (2019 film), a Belgian action and war film 
 Torpedo (Marvel Comics), a Marvel Comics character
 Torpedo (G.I. Joe), a character in the G.I. Joe universe
 Photon torpedo, fictional weapon popularized by the science fiction saga Star Trek
 Torpedo (Bob's Burgers), an episode of the animated series Bob's Burgers

Sports
 FC Torpedo Kutaisi, a Georgian Football Club
 FC Torpedo Minsk, a Belarusian Football Club
 FC Torpedo Moscow, a Russian Football Club
 FC Torpedo-RG, a Russian Football Club
 FC Torpedo Zaporizhzhia, a Ukrainian Football Club
 FC Torpedo-ZIL, a defunct Russian Football Club, now FC Moscow
 FC Torpedo-BelAZ Zhodino, a Belarusian Football Club
 Torpedo punt, a specialised kick used in Australian Rules Football
 Torpedo system, a strategy in ice hockey
 "The Torpedo", a nickname of the Russian auto racing driver Daniil Kvyat
 "Torpedo" Tom Blower (1914–1955), British long-distance swimmer
 "Thorpedo", a nickname of the Australian swimmer Ian Thorpe

Other uses
Torpedo (petroleum), explosive used in an oil well to start or increase the flow of oil
Torpedo, Pennsylvania
"Torpedo", 1920s slang for a hit man or "hired gun"
"Torpedo", in American cigar slang, a cigar with a pointed tip, also called a pyramid or belicoso
A type of drinking game (see shotgunning)
A US beer keg with a capacity of 5.23 US gallons